Ernst Morwitz (September 13, 1887 – September 20, 1971) was a German-American poet, literary historian, and judge. Born in Danzig in 1887, after studying law at Freiburg, Heidelberg, and Berlin,  Morwitz served as a judge in Fürstenwalde from 1910 to 1930, then in Berlin from 1930 until his compulsory retirement due to his Jewish ancestry under the Nazi regime in 1935. He emigrated to the United States in 1938, where he served as a German teacher for the U.S. Army and, after the end of the war, lecturer in German literature at the University of North Carolina, Chapel Hill. He was naturalized as an American citizen in 1948. In 1952 West Germany restored Morwitz to an honorary judicial position, but he decided against returning there. He died in Muralto, Switzerland, in 1971.

Besides his judicial career, from 1905 Morwitz was a friend of the poet Stefan George and member of his circle, publishing poetry in George's journal, the Blätter für die Kunst. Following George's death in 1933 and his own subsequent emigration to the United States, he played an important role in promoting George's work in the Anglosphere through translations of his poems. A posthumous collection of Morwitz's own poems was published in 1974.

References

1887 births
1971 deaths
20th-century American historians
20th-century American male writers
20th-century German historians
20th-century German judges
20th-century German male writers
20th-century German poets
German male poets
German–English translators
Germanists
Jewish emigrants from Nazi Germany to the United States
Language teachers
Literary historians
Humboldt University of Berlin alumni
University of North Carolina at Chapel Hill faculty
20th-century translators
American male non-fiction writers